Kasam Suhaag Ki  is a 1989 Bollywood film directed by Mohan Segal and starring Dharmendra and Rekha.

Cast
Dharmendra
Rekha
Sushma Seth
Jagdeep
Om Shivpuri
Suresh Oberoi
Danny Denzongpa
Alok Nath
Gulshan Grover
Shakti Kapoor

Soundtrack

Reception
Democratic World magazine wrote a critical review of the film and wrote that its stars "cannot save it from sinking".

References

External links 
 

1989 films
1980s Hindi-language films
Films scored by Laxmikant–Pyarelal